Randall Curtis Hogan, also known as Xeno, is the former original lead singer of the band Cheap Trick. He is also a member of the Wisconsin-based band Bad Boy.

Career
One of the first bands that he was a part of was the band Cheap Trick. He left the band shortly after Cheap Trick's formation to join a band called Straight Up and was replaced by Robin Zander. Hogan went on to become a member of Milwaukee-based AOR band Crossfire (since renamed Bad Boy), of which he is still a member. The band was inducted into the Wisconsin Area Music Industry's Hall of Fame in 1994. Hogan also has been with the Sleighriders, No Strings Attached, and Three's a Crowd. He also performs numerous events with multi-instrumentalist Mitch Cooper and drummer Brian Bruendl.

References

Cheap Trick members
American rock singers
Living people
Musicians from Rockford, Illinois
Power pop musicians
1954 births